The Asencio Formation is a geological formation in the Paraná Basin of southwestern Uruguay whose strata date back to the Late Cretaceous (Campanian-Maastrichtian). Dinosaur remains are among the fossils that have been recovered from the formation.

Vertebrate paleofauna 
 Neuquensaurus australis
 Laplatasaurus araukanicus
 Antarctosaurus wichmannianus

Fossil eggs 
 Sphaerovum erbeni
 Tacuarembovum oblongum

See also 
 List of dinosaur-bearing rock formations
 List of fossiliferous stratigraphic units in Uruguay
 Adamantina Formation
 Allen Formation
 Marília Formation

References

Bibliography

Further reading 
 F. v. Huene. 1929. Terrestrische Oberkreide in Uruguay [The terrestrial Upper Cretaceous in Uruguay]. Centralblatt für Mineralogie, Geologie und Paläontologie Abteilung B 1929:107-112

Geologic formations of Uruguay
Upper Cretaceous Series of South America
Cretaceous Uruguay
Campanian Stage
Maastrichtian Stage of South America
Sandstone formations
Ooliferous formations
Paleontology in Uruguay
Formations
Geography of Colonia Department
Geography of Río Negro Department
Geography of Soriano Department
Geography of Tacuarembó Department